This is a list of Panjabi films of 2006.

List of films

External links 
 Punjabi films at the Internet Movie Database

2006
Punjabi